Helene Muller-Landau is a staff scientist at the Smithsonian Institution. Her research focuses on tropical forest diversity and climate interactions with tropical forests.

Education 
Helene Muller-Landau received her bachelor's from the Swathmore College in Mathematics and Statistics.  She received both her masters and PhD in Ecology and Evolutionary Biology from Princeton University.

Awards 
Muller-Landau received the Packer Fellowship for Science and Engineering in 2007.

Research 

In 2010, Muller-Landau published a mathematical model of seed sizes, demonstrating that large seeds are favorable in stressful conditions while small seeds may be advantageous in more favorable conditions.

References 

Year of birth missing (living people)
Living people
Smithsonian Institution people
Swarthmore College alumni
Princeton University alumni
21st-century American scientists
21st-century American women scientists
American ecologists
Women ecologists